Qarah Gonbad or Qareh Gonbad may refer to:
 Qarah Gonbad-e Olya
 Qarah Gonbad-e Sofla